Loup of Fintry is a notable waterfall on the River Endrick around 2 miles to the east of Fintry in Scotland and 17 miles from Stirling, 10 miles from Denny. The total height of the waterfalls is 28.6 m (94 ft) Lowp or "Loup" means leap in Scots.

See also
Waterfalls of Scotland

https://www.natureflip.com/places/loup-of-fintry-waterfall

References

Waterfalls of Stirling (council area)